Georg Fayer (1892 – 5 November 1950) was an Austrian photographer of Hungarian origin. His daughter is artist and photographer .

Fayer died in Cannes when he was about 58 years old.

Further reading 
 Timm Starl: Lexikon zur Fotografie in Österreich 1839 bis 1945. Album Verlag, Vienna 2005,

References

External links 
 Zur Geschichte der Firma Foto Fayer

1892 births
1950 deaths
Hungarian photographers
Austrian photographers
20th-century photographers